is a passenger railway station in the city of Matsudo, Chiba, Japan, operated by the private railway operator Tōbu Railway. The station is numbered "TD-29".

Lines

Station layout
The station consists of one island platform and one side platform serving three tracks, connected to the station building by a footbridge.

Platforms

History
The station opened on 27 December 1923. From 17 March 2012, station numbering was introduced on all Tobu lines, with Mutsumi Station becoming "TD-29".

Passenger statistics
In fiscal 2019, the station was used by an average of 14,840 passengers daily.

Surrounding area
Mutsumi Post Office
Toho Kamagaya Hospital

See also
 List of railway stations in Japan

References

External links

 Railway station information  

Railway stations in Japan opened in 1923
Railway stations in Chiba Prefecture
Tobu Noda Line
Stations of Tobu Railway
Matsudo